Criticism of Islam is broadly defined as criticism of the Islamic religion in its beliefs, principles, and/or any other ideas attributed to Islam.

Criticism of Islam has existed since Islam's formative stages.
Early written disapprovals came from Christians and Jews as well as from some former Muslims such as Ibn al-Rawandi. Later the Muslim world itself received criticism.  Western criticism of Islam grew after the September 11 attacks and other terrorist incidents.

Objects of criticism include the morality of the life of Muhammad, the founder of Islam, in both his public and personal lives. Issues relating to the authenticity and morality of the scriptures of Islam, both the Quran and the hadiths, are also discussed by critics. Islam has also been viewed as a form of Arab imperialism and has received criticism by figures from Africa and India for the destruction of indigenous cultures. Islam's recognition of slavery as an institution, which led to Muslim traders exporting as many as 17 million slaves to the coast of the Indian Ocean, the Middle East, and North Africa, has also been criticized. The Shafi'i version of Islam has received criticism for advocating female genital mutilation and introducing this practice to Southeast Asia, where it was previously nonexistent. More recently, Islamic beliefs regarding human origins, predestination, God's existence and nature, have received criticism for their apparent philosophical and scientific inconsistencies.

Another criticism focuses on the question of human rights in the Islamic world, both historically and in modern Islamic nations, including the treatment of women, LGBT people, and religious and ethnic minorities, as shown in Islamic law and practice. As of 2014, about a quarter of the world's countries and territories (26%) had anti-blasphemy and (13%) had anti-apostasy laws or policies. In 2017, 13 nations, all of which were Muslim majority nations, had the death penalty for apostasy or blasphemy.  In the wake of the recent multiculturalism trend, Islam's influence on the ability or willingness of Muslim immigrants to assimilate in the host nations has been criticized. Assimilationist arguments have also been made in other countries where Muslims are a substantial minority, such as China, India and Russia.

History

Early Islam 

The earliest surviving written criticisms of Islam are to be found in the writings of Christians who came under the early dominion of the Islamic Caliphate. One such Christian was John of Damascus (c. 676–748 AD), who was familiar with Islam and Arabic. The second chapter of his book, The Fountain of Wisdom, titled "Concerning Heresies", presents a series of discussions between Christians and Muslims. John claimed an Arian monk (who he did not know was Bahira) influenced Muhammad and viewed the Islamic doctrines as nothing more than a hodgepodge culled from the Bible. Writing on Islam's claim of Abrahamic ancestry, John explained that the Arabs were called "Saracens" (Greek Σαρακενοί, Sarakenoi) because they were "empty" (κενός, kenos, in Greek) "of Sarah". They were called "Hagarenes" because they were "the descendants of the slave-girl Hagar". In the early formative stage, criticism on Islam was usually hidden, because openly questioning Muhammad or the Quran was punishable not only for the critic but also for the critic's entire community. Jews, for example, passed on criticism on Muhammad by oral-traditions. Although it is hard to verify oral traditions, certain tales and statements could be found of independent communities. According to one narrative, some Jews included hidden messages in the Quran, like the Muqatta'at (Mysterious Letters), which allegedly refers to certain parts of the Tanakh about a Hebrew term denoting a false Prophet.

Other notable early critics of Islam included:
 Abu Isa al-Warraq, a 9th-century scholar and critic of Islam.
 Ibn al-Rawandi, a 9th-century atheist, who repudiated Islam and criticised religion in general.
 al-Ma'arri, an 11th-century Arab poet and critic of Islam and all other religions. Also known for his veganism and antinatalism.
 Abu Bakr al-Razi, a Persian physician, philosopher and alchemist who lived during the Islamic Golden Age. He criticized the concepts of prophethood and revelation in Islam.

Medieval world

Medieval Islamic world 

In the early centuries of the Islamic Caliphate, Islamic law allowed citizens to freely express their views, including criticism of Islam and religious authorities, without fear of persecution. Accordingly, there have been several notable critics and skeptics of Islam that arose from within the Islamic world itself. One eminent critic, living in the tenth and eleventh-century Syria was the blind poet Al-Ma'arri. He became well known for a poetry that was affected by a "pervasive pessimism". He labeled religions in general as "noxious weeds" and said that Islam does not have a monopoly on truth. He had particular contempt for the ulema, writing that:

In 1280, the Jewish philosopher, Ibn Kammuna, criticized Islam in his book Examination of the Three Faiths. He reasoned that the Sharia was incompatible with the principles of justice, and that this undercut the notion of Muhammad being the perfect man: "there is no proof that Muhammad attained perfection and the ability to perfect others as claimed." The philosopher thus claimed that people converted to Islam from ulterior motives:

According to Bernard Lewis, just as it is natural for a Muslim to assume that the converts to his religion are attracted by its truth, it is equally natural for the convert's former coreligionists to look for baser motives and Ibn Kammuna's list seems to cover most of such nonreligious motives.

Maimonides, one of the foremost 12th-century rabbinical arbiters and philosophers, sees the relation of Islam to Judaism as primarily theoretical. Maimonides has no quarrel with the strict monotheism of Islam, but finds fault with the practical politics of Muslim regimes. He also considered Islamic ethics and politics to be inferior to their Jewish counterparts. Maimonides criticised what he perceived as the lack of virtue in the way Muslims rule their societies and relate to one another. In his Epistle to Yemenite Jewry, he refers to Mohammad, as "hameshuga" – "that madman".

Apologetic writings, attributed to Abdullah Ibn al-Muqaffa, not only defended Manichaeism against Islam, but also criticized the Islamic concept of God. Accordingly, the Quranic deity was disregarded as an unjust, tyrannic, irrational and malevolent demonic entity, who "fights with humans and boasts about His victories" and "sitting on a throne, from which He descends". Such anthropomorphic descriptions of God were at odds with the Manichaean understanding of Divinity. Further, according to Manichaeism, it would be impossible that good and evil originate from the same source, therefore the Islamic deity could not be the true god.

Medieval Christianity 

Early criticism came from Christian authors, many of whom viewed Islam as a Christian heresy or a form of idolatry and often explained it in apocalyptic terms. Islamic salvation optimism and its carnality was criticized by Christian writers. Islam's sensual descriptions of paradise led many Christians to conclude that Islam was not a spiritual religion, but a material one. Although sensual pleasure was also present in early Christianity, as seen in the writings of Irenaeus, the doctrines of the former Manichaean Augustine of Hippo led to broad repudiation of bodily pleasure in both life and the afterlife. Ali ibn Sahl Rabban al-Tabari defended the Quranic description of paradise by asserting that the Bible also implies such ideas, such as drinking wine in Gospel of Matthew. During the Fifth Crusade, Pope Innocent III declared that many men had been seduced by Muhammad for the pleasure of flesh.

Defamatory images of Muhammad, derived from early 7th century depictions of Byzantine Church, appear in the 14th-century epic poem Divine Comedy by Dante Alighieri.  Here, Muhammad appears in the eighth circle of hell, along with Ali. Dante does not blame Islam as a whole, but accuses Muhammad of schism, by establishing another religion after Christianity. Some medieval ecclesiastical writers portrayed Muhammad as possessed by Satan, a "precursor of the Antichrist" or the Antichrist himself. The Tultusceptru de libro domni Metobii, an Andalusian manuscript with unknown dating, shows how Muhammad (called Ozim, from Hashim) was tricked by Satan into adulterating an originally pure divine revelation. The story argues God was concerned about the spiritual fate of the Arabs and wanted to correct their deviation from the faith. He then sends an angel to the monk Osius who orders him to preach to the Arabs. Osius however is in ill-health and orders a young monk, Ozim, to carry out the angel's orders instead. Ozim sets out to follow his orders, but gets stopped by an evil angel on the way. The ignorant Ozim believes him to be the same angel that spoke to Osius before. The evil angel modifies and corrupts the original message given to Ozim by Osius, and renames Ozim Muhammad. From this followed the erroneous teachings of Islam, according to the Tultusceptru. According to the monk Bede Muhammad was foretold in Genesis 16:12, which describes Ishmael as "a wild man" whose "hand will be against every man". Bede says about Muhammad: "Now how great is his hand against all and all hands against him; as they impose his authority upon the whole length of Africa and hold both the greater part of Asia and some of Europe, hating and opposing all."

In 1391 a dialogue was believed to have occurred between Byzantine Emperor Manuel II Palaiologos and a Persian scholar in which the Emperor stated:
Otherwise the Greek Orthodox bishop Paul of Antioch accepts Muhammed as a prophet, but not that his mission was universal. Since the law of Christ is superior to the law of Islam, Muhammad was only ordered to the Arabs, whom a prophet was not sent yet.
Denis the Carthusian wrote two treatises to refute Islam at the request of Nicholas of Cusa, Contra perfidiam Mahometi, et contra multa dicta Sarracenorum libri quattuor and Dialogus disputationis inter Christianum et Sarracenum de lege Christi et contra perfidiam Mahometi.

Enlightenment Europe 

David Hume was critical of traditional religion and scholars generally agree that Hume was both a naturalist and a sceptic, though he considered monotheistic religions to be more "comfortable to sound reason" than polytheism and found Islam to be more "ruthless" than Christianity. In Of the Standard of Taste, an essay by Hume, the Quran is described as an "absurd performance" of a "pretended prophet" who lacked "a just sentiment of morals". Attending to the narration, Hume says, "we shall soon find, that [Muhammad] bestows praise on such instances of treachery, inhumanity, cruelty, revenge, bigotry, as are utterly incompatible with civilized society. No steady rule of right seems there to be attended to; and every action is blamed or praised, so far as it is beneficial or hurtful to the true believers."

The commonly held view in Europe during the Enlightenment was that Islam, then synonymous with the Ottoman Empire, was a bloody, ruthless and intolerant religion. In the European view, Islam lacked divine authority and regarded the sword as the route to heaven. Hume appears to represent this view in his reference to the "bloody principles" of Islam, though he also makes similar critical comments about the "bloody designs" characterizing the conflict between Catholics and Protestants during the Reformation. Many contemporary works about Islam were available to influence Hume's opinions by authors such as Isaac Barrow, Humphrey Prideaux, John Jackson, Charles Wolseley, Hugo Grotius, Paul Rycaut, Thomas Hyde, Pierre Bayle, and Blaise Pascal. The writers of this period were also influenced by George Sale who, in 1743, had translated the Quran into English.

Modern era

Western authors 

In the early 20th century, the prevailing view among Europeans was that Islam was the root cause of Arab and Berber "backwardness". They saw Islam as an obstacle to assimilation, a view that was expressed by a writer in colonial French Algeria named André Servier. In his book, titled Islam and the Psychology of the Musulman, Servier wrote that, "The only thing Arabs ever invented was their religion. And this religion is, precisely, the main obstacle between them and us." Servier describes Islam as a "religious nationalism in which every Muslim brain is steeped". According to Servier, the only reason this nationalism has not "been able to pose a threat to humanity" was that the "rigid dogma" of Islam had rendered the Arabs "incapable of fighting against the material forces placed at the disposal of Western civilization by science and progress".

The Victorian orientalist scholar Sir William Muir criticised Islam for what he perceived to be an inflexible nature, which he held responsible for stifling progress and impeding social advancement in Muslim countries. The following sentences are taken from the Rede Lecture he delivered at Cambridge in 1881:

The church historian Philip Schaff described Islam as spread by violence and fanaticism, and producing a variety of social ills in the regions it conquered.

Schaff also described Islam as a derivative religion based on an amalgamation of "heathenism, Judaism and Christianity".

J. M. Neale criticized Islam in terms similar to those of Schaff, arguing that it was made up of a mixture of beliefs that provided something for everyone. 

James Fitzjames Stephen, describing what he understood to be the Islamic conception of the ideal society, wrote the following:

G. K. Chesterton criticized Islam as a derivative from Christianity. He described it as a heresy or parody of Christianity. In The Everlasting Man he says:

Winston Churchill criticized what he alleged to be the effects Islam had on its believers, which he described as fanatical frenzy combined with fatalistic apathy, enslavement of women, and militant proselytizing. In his 1899 book The River War he says:

According to historian Warren Dockter, Churchill wrote this during a time of a fundamentalist revolt in Sudan and this statement does not reflect his full view of Islam, which were "often paradoxical and complex". He could be critical but at times "romanticized" the Islamic world; he exhibited great "respect, understanding and magnanimity". Churchill had a fascination of Islam and Islamic civilization. Winston Churchill's future sister-in-law expressed concerns about his fascination by stating, "[p]lease don't become converted to Islam; I have noticed in your disposition a tendency to orientalism." According to historian Warren Dockter, however, he "never seriously considered converting". He primarily admired its martial aspects, the "Ottoman Empire's history of territorial expansion and military acumen", to the extent that in 1897 he wished to fight for the Ottoman Empire. According to Dockter, this was largely for his "lust for glory". Based on Churchill's letters, he seemed to regard Islam and Christianity as equals.

During a lecture given at the University of Regensburg in 2006, Pope Benedict XVI quoted an unfavorable remark about Islam made at the end of the 14th century by Manuel II Palaiologos, the Byzantine emperor:  As the English translation of the Pope's lecture was disseminated across the world, many Muslim politicians and religious leaders protested against what they saw as an insulting mischaracterization of Islam. Mass street protests were mounted in many Islamic countries, the Majlis-e-Shoora (Pakistani parliament) unanimously called on the Pope to retract "this objectionable statement".

South Asian authors 

The Hindu philosopher Vivekananda commented on Islam:

Dayanand Saraswati calls the concept of Islam to be highly offensive, and doubted that there is any connection of Islam with God:

Pandit Lekh Ram regarded that Islam was grown through the violence and desire for wealth. He further asserted that Muslims deny the entire Islamic prescribed violence and atrocities, and will continue doing so. He wrote:

Mahatma Gandhi, the leader of the 20th-century Indian independence movement, deemed the aggressive attitude among Muslims to have been influenced by the religious environment of being in a minority as well as Islamic imperialistic history, contrary to the "non violence" found in the Quran:

Jawaharlal Nehru, the first Prime Minister of India, in his book The Discovery of India, writes that during the times of Muslim conquests, Islam had "become a more rigid faith suited more to military conquests rather than the conquests of the mind," and contrary to the "religious belief in the brotherhood of Islam," a "class bound and feudal" outlook was employed:

Other authors 

Iranian writer Sadegh Hedayat regarded Islam as the corrupter of Iran, he said:

Nobel prize-winning novelist V. S. Naipaul stated that Islam requires its adherents to destroy everything which is not related to it. He described it as having a:

Nobel prize-winning playwright Wole Soyinka stated that Islam had a role in denigrating African spiritual traditions. He criticized attempts to whitewash what he sees as the destructive and coercive history of Islam on the continent:

Soyinka also regarded Islam as "superstition", and said that it does not belong to Africa. He stated that it is mainly spread with violence and force.

Tatar Tengrists criticize Islam as a semitic religion, which forced Turks to submission to an alien culture. Submission and humility, two significant components of Islamic spirituality, are disregarded as major failings of Islam, not as virtues. Further, since Islam mentions semitic history as if it were the history of all mankind, but disregards components of other cultures and spirituality, the international approach of Islam is seen as a threat. It additionally gives Imams an opportunity to march against their own people under the banner of international Islam.

Mustafa Kemal Atatürk, founder of the Turkish Republic, described Islam as the religion of the Arabs in his own work titled Vatandaş için Medeni Bilgiler by his own critical and nationalist views:

Sami Aldeeb, Palestinian-born Swiss lawyer and author of many books and articles on Arab and Islamic law, expressed various positions critical of Islam, for example, he positioned himself for a ban on the erection of minarets in Switzerland, since in his opinion the constitution allows prayer, but not shouting.

Scripture

Criticism of the Quran 

Originality of Quranic manuscripts. According to traditional Islamic scholarship, all of the Quran was written down by Muhammad's companions while he was alive (during 610–632 CE), but it was primarily an orally related document. The written compilation of the whole Quran in its definite form as we have it now was not completed until many years after the death of Muhammad. John Wansbrough, Patricia Crone and Yehuda D. Nevo argue that all the primary sources which exist are from 150 to 300 years after the events which they describe, and thus are chronologically far removed from those events.

Imperfections in the Quran. Critics reject the idea that the Quran is miraculously perfect and impossible to imitate as asserted in the Quran itself. The 1901–1906 Jewish Encyclopedia, for example, writes: "The language of the Koran is held by the Mohammedans to be a peerless model of perfection. Critics, however, argue that peculiarities can be found in the text. For example, critics note that a sentence in which something is said concerning Allah is sometimes followed immediately by another in which Allah is the speaker (examples of this are suras xvi. 81, xxvii. 61, xxxi. 9, and xliii. 10). Many peculiarities in the positions of words are due to the necessities of rhyme (lxix. 31, lxxiv. 3), while the use of many rare words and new forms may be traced to the same cause (comp. especially xix. 8, 9, 11, 16)."

Judaism and the Quran. According to the Jewish Encyclopedia, "The dependence of Mohammed upon his Jewish teachers or upon what he heard of the Jewish Haggadah and Jewish practices is now generally conceded." John Wansbrough believes that the Quran is a redaction in part of other sacred scriptures, in particular the Judaeo-Christian scriptures. Herbert Berg writes that "Despite John Wansbrough's very cautious and careful inclusion of qualifications such as "conjectural," and "tentative and emphatically provisional", his work is condemned by some. Some of this negative reaction is undoubtedly due to its radicalness... Wansbrough's work has been embraced wholeheartedly by few and has been employed in a piecemeal fashion by many. Many praise his insights and methods, if not all of his conclusions." Early jurists and theologians of Islam mentioned some Jewish influence but they also say where it is seen and recognized as such, it is perceived as a debasement or a dilution of the authentic message. Bernard Lewis describes this as "something like what in Christian history was called a Judaizing heresy." According to Moshe Sharon, the story of Muhammad having Jewish teachers is a legend developed in the 10th century CE. Philip Schaff described the Quran as having "many passages of poetic beauty, religious fervor, and wise counsel, but mixed with absurdities, bombast, unmeaning images, low sensuality."

Mohammed and God as speakers. According to Ibn Warraq, the Iranian rationalist Ali Dashti criticized the Quran on the basis that for some passages, "the speaker cannot have been God." Warraq gives Surah Al-Fatiha as an example of a passage which is "clearly addressed to God, in the form of a prayer." He says that by only adding the word "say" in front of the passage, this difficulty could have been removed. Furthermore, it is also known that one of the companions of Muhammad, Ibn Masud, rejected Surah Fatihah as being part of the Quran; these kind of disagreements are, in fact, common among the companions of Muhammad who could not decide which surahs were part of the Quran and which not.

Other criticism:
 The Quran contains verses which are difficult to understand or contradictory.
 Some accounts of the history of Islam say there were two verses of the Quran that were allegedly added by Muhammad when he was tricked by Satan (in an incident known as the "Story of the Cranes", later referred to as the "Satanic Verses"). These verses were then retracted at angel Gabriel's behest.
 The author of the Apology of al-Kindy Abd al-Masih ibn Ishaq al-Kindi (not to be confused with the famed philosopher al-Kindi) claimed that the narratives in the Quran were "all jumbled together and intermingled" and that this was "an evidence that many different hands have been at work therein, and caused discrepancies, adding or cutting out whatever they liked or disliked".
 The companions of Muhammad could not agree on which surahs were part of the Quran and which not. Two of the most famous companions being Ibn Masud and Ubay ibn Ka'b.

Pre-existing sources

Critics point to various pre-existing sources to argue against the traditional narrative of revelation from God. Some scholars have calculated that one third of the Quran has pre-Islamic Christian origins. Aside from the Bible, the Quran relies on several Apocryphal and legendary sources, like the Protoevangelium of James, Gospel of Pseudo-Matthew, and several infancy gospels. Several narratives rely on Jewish Midrash Tanhuma legends, like the narrative of Cain learning to bury the body of Abel in Quran 5:31. Norman Geisler argues that the dependence of the Quran on preexisting sources is one evidence of a purely human origin. Richard Carrier regards this reliance on pre-Islamic Christian sources as evidence that Islam derived from a Torah-observant sect of Christianity.

Criticism of the Hadith 

Hadith are Muslim traditions relating to the Sunnah (words and deeds) of Muhammad. They are drawn from the writings of scholars writing between 844 and 874 CE, more than 200 years after the death of Mohammed in 632 CE. Within Islam, different schools and sects have different opinions on the proper selection and use of Hadith. The four schools of Sunni Islam all consider Hadith second only to the Quran, although they differ on how much freedom of interpretation should be allowed to legal scholars. Shi'i scholars disagree with Sunni scholars as to which Hadith should be considered reliable. The Shi'as accept the Sunnah of Ali and the Imams as authoritative in addition to the Sunnah of Muhammad, and as a consequence they maintain their own, different, collections of Hadith.

It has been suggested that there exists around the Hadith three major sources of corruption: political conflicts, sectarian prejudice, and the desire to translate the underlying meaning, rather than the original words verbatim.

Muslim critics of the hadith, Quranists, reject the authority of hadith on theological grounds, pointing to verses in the Quran itself: "Nothing have We omitted from the Book", declaring that all necessary instruction can be found within the Quran, without reference to the Hadith. They claim that following the Hadith has led to people straying from the original purpose of God's revelation to Muhammad, adherence to the Quran alone. Ghulam Ahmed Pervez (1903–1985) was a noted critic of the Hadith and believed that the Quran alone was all that was necessary to discern God's will and our obligations. A fatwa, ruling, signed by more than a thousand orthodox clerics, denounced him as a 'kafir', a non-believer. His seminal work, Maqam-e Hadith argued that the Hadith were composed of "the garbled words of previous centuries", but suggests that he is not against the idea of collected sayings of the Prophet, only that he would consider any hadith that goes against the teachings of Quran to have been falsely attributed to the Prophet. The 1986 Malaysian book "Hadith: A Re-evaluation" by Kassim Ahmad was met with controversy and some scholars declared him an apostate from Islam for suggesting that "the hadith are sectarian, anti-science, anti-reason and anti-women."

John Esposito notes that "Modern Western scholarship has seriously questioned the historicity and authenticity of the hadith", maintaining that "the bulk of traditions attributed to the Prophet Muhammad were actually written much later." He mentions Joseph Schacht, considered the father of the revisionist movement, as one scholar who argues this, claiming that Schacht "found no evidence of legal traditions before 722," from which Schacht concluded that "the Sunna of the Prophet is not the words and deeds of the Prophet, but apocryphal material" dating from later. Other scholars, however, such as Wilferd Madelung, have argued that "wholesale rejection as late fiction is unjustified".

Orthodox Muslims do not deny the existence of false hadith, but believe that through the scholars' work, these false hadith have been largely eliminated.

Lack of secondary evidence 

The traditional view of Islam has also been criticised for the lack of supporting evidence consistent with that view, such as the lack of archaeological evidence, and discrepancies with non-Muslim literary sources. In the 1970s, what has been described as a "wave of sceptical scholars" challenged a great deal of the received wisdom in Islamic studies. They argued that the Islamic historical tradition had been greatly corrupted in transmission. They tried to correct or reconstruct the early history of Islam from other, presumably more reliable, sources such as coins, inscriptions, and non-Islamic sources. The oldest of this group was John Wansbrough (1928–2002). Wansbrough's works were widely noted, but perhaps not widely read.

In 1972 a cache of ancient Qurans in a mosque in Sana'a, Yemen was discovered – commonly known as the Sana'a manuscripts. The German scholar Gerd R. Puin has been investigating these Quran fragments for years. His research team made 35,000 microfilm photographs of the manuscripts, which he dated to early part of the 8th century. Puin has not published the entirety of his work, but noted unconventional verse orderings, minor textual variations, and rare styles of orthography. He also suggested that some of the parchments were palimpsests which had been reused. Puin believed that this implied a text that changed over time as opposed to one that remained the same.

Kaaba 

The Kaaba is the most sacred site in Islam. Criticism has centered on the origins of the Kaaba. In her book, Islam: A Short History, Karen Armstrong asserts that the Kaaba was officially dedicated to Hubal, a Nabatean deity, and contained 360 idols that probably represented the days of the year. Imoti contends that there were numerous such Kaaba sanctuaries in Arabia at one time, but this was the only one built of stone. The others also allegedly had counterparts of the Black Stone. There was a "red stone", the deity of the south Arabian city of Ghaiman, and the "white stone" in the Kaaba of al-Abalat (near the city of Tabala, south of Mecca). Grunebaum in Classical Islam points out that the experience of divinity of that period was often associated with stone fetishes, mountains, special rock formations, or "trees of strange growth".

According to Sarwar, about 400 years before the birth of Muhammad, a man named "Amr bin Lahyo bin Harath bin Amr ul-Qais bin Thalaba bin Azd bin Khalan bin Babalyun bin Saba", who was descended from Qahtan and was the king of Hijaz had placed a Hubal idol onto the roof of the Kaaba. This idol was one of the chief deities of the ruling tribe Quraysh. The idol was made of red agate and shaped like a human, but with the right hand broken off and replaced with a golden hand. When the idol was moved inside the Kaaba, it had seven arrows in front of it, which were used for divination. According to the Encyclopædia Britannica, "before the rise of Islam it was revered as a sacred sanctuary and was a site of pilgrimage." Many Muslim and academic historians stress the power and importance of the pre-Islamic Mecca. They depict it as a city grown rich on the proceeds of the spice trade. Patricia Crone believes that this is an exaggeration and that Mecca may only have been an outpost trading with nomads for leather, cloth, and camel butter. Crone argues that if Mecca had been a well-known center of trade, it would have been mentioned by later authors such as Procopius, Nonnosus, or the Syrian church chroniclers writing in Syriac. The town is absent, however, from any geographies or histories written in the three centuries before the rise of Islam.

Ethics

Muhammad 

Muhammad is considered one of the prophets in Islam and as a model for followers. Critics such as Sigismund Koelle and former Muslim Ibn Warraq see some of Muhammad's actions as immoral.

Ka'b ibn al-Ashraf wrote a poetic eulogy commemorating the slain Quraish notables; later, he had traveled to Mecca and provoked the Quraish to fight Muhammad. He also wrote erotic poetry about Muslim women, which offended the Muslims there. This poetry influenced so many that this too was considered directly against the Constitution of Medina which states, loyalty gives protection against treachery and this document will not (be employed to) protect one who is unjust or commits a crime. Other sources also state that he was plotting to assassinate Muhammad.
Muhammad called upon his followers to kill Ka'b. Muhammad ibn Maslama offered his services, collecting four others. By pretending to have turned against Muhammad, Muhammad ibn Maslama and the others enticed Ka'b out of his fortress on a moonlit night, and killed him in spite of his vigorous resistance. The Jews were terrified at his assassination, and as the historian Ibn Ishaq put it "...there was not a Jew who did not fear for his life".

Age of Muhammad's wife Aisha

According to scriptural Sunni's Hadith sources, Aisha was six or seven years old when she was married to Muhammad and nine when the marriage was consummated.

Muhammad ibn Jarir al-Tabari, born in Persia 200 years after Muhammmad's death, suggested that she was ten years old. Six hundred years after Muhammad, Ibn Khallikan recorded that she was nine years old at marriage, and twelve at consummation. Ibn Sa'd al-Baghdadi, born about 150 years after Muhammad's death, cited Hisham ibn Urwah as saying that she was nine years old at marriage, and twelve at consummation, but Hisham ibn Urwah's original source is otherwise unknown, and Ibn Sa'd al-Baghdadi's work does not have the high religious status of the Hadith.

In the twentieth century, Indian writer Muhammad Ali challenged the Hadith showing that Aisha was not as young as the traditional sources claim, arguing that instead, a new interpretation of the Hadith compiled by Mishkat al-Masabih, Wali-ud-Din Muhammad ibn Abdullah Al-Khatib, could indicate that Aisha would have been nineteen years old around the time of her marriage.

Colin Turner, a UK professor of Islamic studies, states that since such marriages between an older man and a young girl were customary among the Bedouins, Muhammad's marriage would not have been considered improper by his contemporaries. Karen Armstrong, the British author on comparative religion, has affirmed that "There was no impropriety in Muhammad's marriage to Aisha. Marriages conducted in absentia to seal an alliance were often contracted at this time between adults and minors who were even younger than Aisha."

Ethics in the Quran 

According to some critics, the morality of the Quran appears to be a moral regression when judged by the standards of the moral traditions of Judaism and Christianity it says that it builds upon. The Catholic Encyclopedia, for example, states that "the ethics of Islam are far inferior to those of Judaism and even more inferior to those of the New Testament" and "that in the ethics of Islam there is a great deal to admire and to approve, is beyond dispute; but of originality or superiority, there is none."
 Critics stated that the Quran 4:34 allows Muslim men to discipline their wives by striking them. There is however confusion amongst translations of Quran with the original Arabic term "wadribuhunna" being translated as "to go away from them", "beat", "strike lightly" and "separate". The film Submission, which rose to fame after the murder of its director Theo van Gogh, critiqued this and similar verses of the Quran by displaying them painted on the bodies of abused Muslim women. Ayaan Hirsi Ali, the film's writer, said "it is written in the Koran a woman may be slapped if she is disobedient. This is one of the evils I wish to point out in the film".
 Some critics argue that the Quran is incompatible with other religious scriptures as it attacks and advocates hate against people of other religions. For instance, Sam Harris interprets certain verses of the Quran as sanctioning military action against unbelievers as a whole both during the lifetime of Muhammad and after. The Quran said "Fight those who do not believe in Allah or in the Last Day and who do not consider unlawful what Allah and His Messenger have made unlawful and who do not adopt the religion of truth from those who were given the Scripture – [fight] until they give the jizyah willingly while they are humbled."(Quran 9:29)  Jizya is a tax for "protection" paid by non-Muslims to a Muslim ruler, for the exemption from military service for non-Muslims, and for the permission to practice a non-Muslim faith with some communal autonomy in a Muslim state.
In The End of Faith Harris argues that Muslim extremism is simply a consequence of taking the Quran literally, and is skeptical that moderate Islam is possible. Various calls to arms were identified in the Quran by US citizen Mohammed Reza Taheri-azar, all of which were cited as "most relevant to my actions on March 3, 2006" (Q9:44, 9:19, 57:10–11,   8:72–73, 9:120, 3:167–75, 4:66, 4:104, 9:81,   9:93–94, 9:100, 16:110, 61:11–12, 47:35).

 Max I. Dimont interprets that the Houris described in the Quran are specifically dedicated to "male pleasure". However, according to Pakistani Islamic scholar Maulana Umar Ahmed Usmani "it is a misconception that hurun (Houri) means the females of paradise who will be reserved for good men. He says that "'hur' or 'hurun' is the plural of both 'ahwaro', which is the masculine form as well as 'haurao', which is feminine. It means both pure males and pure females. He says that basically the word 'hurun' means white." 
Henry Martyn claims that the concept of the Houris was chosen to satisfy Muhammad's followers.

Views on slavery 

Bernard Lewis writes: "In one of the sad paradoxes of human history, it was the humanitarian reforms brought by Islam that resulted in a vast development of the slave trade inside, and still more outside, the Islamic empire." He notes that the Islamic injunctions against the enslavement of Muslims led to massive importation of slaves from the outside. According to Patrick Manning, Islam by recognizing and codifying the slavery seems to have done more to protect and expand slavery than the reverse.

Similarly, the practice of freeing slaves in atonement for certain sins appears to be introduced by the Quran (but compare Exod 21:26-7). The forced prostitution of female slaves, a Near Eastern custom of great antiquity, is condemned in the Quran. Murray Gordon notes that this ban is "of no small significance". Brockopp writes: "Other cultures limit a master's right to harm a slave but few exhort masters to treat their slaves kindly, and the placement of slaves in the same category as other weak members of society who deserve protection is unknown outside the Qur'an. The unique contribution of the Qur'an, then, is to be found in its emphasis on the place of slaves in society and society's responsibility toward the slave, perhaps the most progressive legislation on slavery in its time."

Critics argue unlike Western societies which in their opposition to slavery spawned anti-slavery movements whose numbers and enthusiasm often grew out of church groups, no such grass-roots organizations ever developed in Muslim societies. In Muslim politics the state unquestioningly accepted the teachings of Islam and applied them as law. Islam, by sanctioning slavery, also extended legitimacy to the traffic in slaves.

According to Maurice Middleberg, however, "Sura 90 in the Quran states that the righteous path involves 'the freeing of slaves. Murray Gordon characterizes Muhammad's approach to slavery as reformist rather than revolutionary. He did not set out to abolish slavery, but rather to improve the conditions of slaves by urging his followers to treat their slaves humanely and free them as a way of expiating one's sins which some modern Muslim authors have interpreted as indication that Muhammad envisioned a gradual abolition of slavery.

Critics say it was only in the early 20th century (post World War I) that slavery gradually became outlawed and suppressed in Muslim lands, largely due to pressure exerted by Western nations such as Britain and France. Gordon describes the lack of homegrown Islamic abolition movements as owing much to the fact that it was deeply anchored in Islamic law. By legitimizing slavery and – by extension – traffic in slaves, Islam elevated those practices to an unassailable moral plane. As a result, in no part of the Muslim world was an ideological challenge ever mounted against slavery. The political and social system in Muslim society would have taken a dim view of such a challenge.

However, In Islamic jurisprudence, slavery was theoretically an exceptional condition under the dictum The basic principle is liberty (al-'asl huwa 'l-hurriya), so that for a foundling or another person whose status was unknown freedom was presumed and enslavement forbidden.

The issue of slavery in the Islamic world in modern times is controversial. Critics argue there is hard evidence of its existence and destructive effects. Others maintain slavery in central Islamic lands has been virtually extinct since mid-twentieth century, and that reports from Sudan and Somalia showing practice of slavery is in border areas as a result of continuing war and not Islamic belief. In recent years, according to some scholars, there has been a "worrying trend" of "reopening" of the issue of slavery by some conservative Salafi Islamic scholars after its "closing" earlier in the 20th century when Muslim countries banned slavery and "most Muslim scholars" found the practice "inconsistent with Qur'anic morality".

Shaykh Fadhlalla Haeri of Karbala expressed the view in 1993 that the enforcement of servitude can occur but is restricted to war captives and those born of slaves.

In a 2014 issue of their digital magazine Dabiq, the Islamic State of Iraq and the Levant explicitly claimed religious justification for enslaving Yazidi women.

Apostasy 

According to Islamic law, apostasy is identified by a list of actions such as conversion to another religion, denying the existence of God, rejecting the prophets, mocking God or the prophets, idol worship, rejecting the sharia, or permitting behavior that is forbidden by the sharia, such as adultery or the eating of forbidden foods or drinking of alcoholic beverages. The majority of Muslim scholars hold to the traditional view that apostasy is punishable by death or imprisonment until repentance, at least for adult men of sound mind.

The kind of apostasy which the jurists generally deemed punishable was of the political kind, although there were considerable legal differences of opinion on this matter. Wael Hallaq states that "[in] a culture whose lynchpin is religion, religious principles and religious morality, apostasy is in some way equivalent to high treason in the modern nation-state".

Laws prohibiting religious conversion run contrary to Article 18 of the Universal Declaration of Human Rights, which states that "[e]veryone has the right to freedom of thought, conscience and religion; this right includes freedom to change his religion or belief, and freedom, either alone or in community with others and in public or private, to manifest his religion or belief in teaching, practice, worship and observance."
The English historian C. E. Bosworth suggests the traditional view of apostasy hampered the development of Islamic learning, arguing that while the organizational form of the Christian university allowed them to develop and flourish into the modern university, "the Muslim ones remained constricted by the doctrine of waqf alone, with their physical plant often deteriorating hopelessly and their curricula narrowed by the exclusion of the non-traditional religious sciences like philosophy and natural science," out of fear that these could evolve into potential toe-holds for kufr, those people who reject God."

At a 2009 human rights conference at Mofid University in Qom, Araki stated that "if an individual doubts Islam, he does not become the subject of punishment, but if the doubt is openly expressed, this is not permissible." As one observer (Sadakat Kadri) noted, this "freedom" has the advantage that "state officials could not punish an unmanifested belief even if they wanted to".

In 13 Muslim-majority countries atheism is punishable by death.
However, according to legal historian Sadakat Kadri, while apostasy was traditionally punished by death, executions were rare because "it was widely believed" that any accused apostate "who repented by articulating the shahada" (LA ILAHA ILLALLAH "There is no God but God") "had to be forgiven" and their punishment delayed until after Judgement Day. This principle was upheld "even in extreme situations", such as when an offender adopts Islam "only for fear of death", based on the hadith that Muhammad had upbraided a follower for killing a raider who had uttered the shahada.

Islamic law 

Bernard Lewis summarizes:

The four Sunni schools of Islamic jurisprudence, as well as Shi'a scholars, agree on the difference of punishment between male and female. A sane adult male apostate may be executed. A female apostate may be put to death, according to the majority view, or imprisoned until she repents, according to others.

The Quran threatens apostates with punishment in the next world only, the historian W. Heffening states, the traditions however contain the element of death penalty. Muslim scholar Shafi'i interprets verse Quran 2:217 as adducing the main evidence for the death penalty in Quran. The historian Wael Hallaq states the later addition of death penalty "reflects a later reality and does not stand in accord with the deeds of the Prophet." He further states that "nothing in the law governing apostate and apostasy derives from the letter of the holy text."

William Montgomery Watt, in response to a question about Western views of the Islamic Law as being cruel, states that "In Islamic teaching, such penalties may have been suitable for the age in which Muhammad lived. However, as societies have since progressed and become more peaceful and ordered, they are not suitable any longer."

Some contemporary Islamic jurists from both the Sunni and Shia denominations together with Quran only Muslims have argued or issued fatwas that state that either the changing of religion is not punishable or is only punishable under restricted circumstances. For example, Grand Ayatollah Hussein-Ali Montazeri argues that no Quranic verse prescribes an earthly penalty for apostasy and adds that it is not improbable that the punishment was prescribed by Muhammad at early Islam due to political conspiracies against Islam and Muslims and not only because of changing the belief or expressing it. Montazeri defines different types of apostasy. He does not hold that a reversion of belief because of investigation and research is punishable by death but prescribes capital punishment for a desertion of Islam out of malice and enmity towards the Muslim.

According to Yohanan Friedmann, an Israeli Islamic Studies scholar, a Muslim may stress tolerant elements of Islam (by for instance adopting the broadest interpretation of Quran 2:256 ("No compulsion is there in religion...") or the humanist approach attributed to Ibrahim al-Nakha'i), without necessarily denying the existence of other ideas in the Medieval Islamic tradition but rather discussing them in their historical context (by for example arguing that "civilizations comparable with the Islamic one, such as the Sassanids and the Byzantines, also punished apostasy with death. Similarly neither Judaism nor Christianity treated apostasy and apostates with any particular kindness"). Friedmann continues:

Human rights conventions 

Some widely held interpretations of Islam are inconsistent with Human Rights conventions that recognize the right to change religion. In particular article 18 of the Universal Declaration of Human Rights
states:

To implement this, Article 18 (2) of the International Covenant on Civil and Political Rights states:

The right for Muslims to change their religion is not afforded by the Iranian Shari'ah law, which specifically forbids it. In 1981, the Iranian representative to the United Nations, Said Rajaie-Khorassani, articulated the position of his country regarding the Universal Declaration of Human Rights, by saying that the UDHR was "a secular understanding of the Judeo-Christian tradition", which could not be implemented by Muslims without trespassing the Islamic law. As a matter of law, on the basis of its obligations as a state party to the ICCPR, Iran is obliged to uphold the right of individuals to practice the religion of their choice and to change religions, including converting from Islam. The prosecution of converts from Islam on the basis of religious edicts that identify apostasy as an offense punishable by death is clearly at variance with this obligation. Muslim countries such as Sudan and Saudi Arabia, have the death penalty for apostasy from Islam. These countries have criticized the Universal Declaration of Human Rights for its perceived failure to take into account the cultural and religious context of non-Western countries. In 1990, the Organisation of Islamic Cooperation published a separate Cairo Declaration on Human Rights in Islam compliant with Shari'ah. Although granting many of the rights in the UN declaration, it does not grant Muslims the right to convert to other religions, and restricts freedom of speech to those expressions of it that are not in contravention of the Islamic law.

Abul Ala Maududi, the founder of Jamaat-e-Islami, wrote a book called Human Rights in Islam, in which he argues that respect for human rights has always been enshrined in Sharia law (indeed that the roots of these rights are to be found in Islamic doctrine) and criticizes Western notions that there is an inherent contradiction between the two. Western scholars have, for the most part, rejected Maududi's analysis.

Islam and Violence 

The September 11 attacks on the United States, and various other acts of Islamic terrorism over the 21st century, have resulted in many non-Muslims' indictment of Islam as a violent religion. In particular, the Quran's teachings on matters of war and peace have become topics of heated discussion in recent years. On the one hand, some critics claim that certain verses of the Quran sanction military action against unbelievers as a whole both during the lifetime of Muhammad and after. The Quran says, "Fight in the name of your religion with those who fight against you." On the other hand, most Muslim scholars, including Ahmadiyya, argue that such verses of the Quran are interpreted out of context, and argue that when the verses are read in context it clearly appears that the Quran prohibits aggression, and allows fighting only in self-defense.

Orientalist David Margoliouth described the Battle of Khaybar as the "stage at which Islam became a menace to the whole world." According to Margoliouth, earlier attacks on the Meccans and the Jewish tribes of Medina (e.g., the invasion of Banu Qurayza) could be at least plausibly be ascribed to wrongs done to Muhammad or the Islamic community. Margoliouth argues that the Jews of Khaybar had done nothing to harm Muhammad or his followers, and ascribes the attack to a desire for plunder.

Montgomery Watt mentions another reason for the battle. He believes Jews' intriguing and use of their wealth to incite tribes against Muhammad left him no choice but to attack. Vaglieri concurs that one reason for attack was that the Jews of Khaybar were responsible for the Confederates that attacked Muslims during the Battle of the Trench.
Shibli Numani also sees Khaybar's actions during the Battle of the Trench, and draws particular attention to Banu Nadir's leader Huyayy ibn Akhtab, who had gone to the Banu Qurayza during the battle to instigate them to attack Muhammad.

Jihad, an Islamic term, is a religious duty of Muslims. In Arabic, the word jihād translates as a noun meaning "struggle". Jihad appears 41 times in the Quran and frequently in the idiomatic expression "striving for the sake of God (al-jihad fi sabil Allah)". Jihad is an important religious duty for several sects in Islam. A minority among the Sunni scholars sometimes refer to this duty as the sixth pillar of Islam, though it occupies no such official status. In Twelver Shi'a Islam, however, Jihad is one of the 10 Practices of the Religion. The Quran calls repeatedly for jihad, or holy struggle, resistance, against unbelievers, including, at times, Jews and Christians. Middle East historian Bernard Lewis argues that "the overwhelming majority of classical theologians, jurists, and traditionalists (specialists in the hadith) understood the obligation of jihad in a military sense." Furthermore, Lewis maintains that for most of the recorded history of Islam, from the lifetime of Muhammad onward, the word jihad was used in a primarily military sense.

The Quran: (8:12): "...cast terror in their hearts and strike upon their necks." The phrase that they have been "commanded to terrorize the disbelievers" has been cited in motivation of Jihadi terror. One Jihadi cleric has said:
Another aim and objective of jihad is to drive terror in the hearts of the [infidels]. To terrorize them. Did you know that we were commanded in the Qur'an with terrorism? ...Allah said, and prepare for them to the best of your ability with power, and with horses of war. To drive terror in the hearts of my enemies, Allah's enemies, and your enemies. And other enemies which you don't know, only Allah knows them... So we were commanded to drive terror into the hearts of the [infidels], to prepare for them with the best of our abilities with power. Then the Prophet said, nay, the power is your ability to shoot. The power which you are commanded with here, is your ability to shoot. Another aim and objective of jihad is to kill the [infidels], to lessen the population of the [infidels]... it is not right for a Prophet to have captives until he makes the Earth warm with blood... so, you should always seek to lessen the population of the [infidels].

David Cook, author of Understanding Jihad, said "In reading Muslim literature – both contemporary and classical – one can see that the evidence for the primacy of spiritual jihad is negligible. Today it is certain that no Muslim, writing in a non-Western language (such as Arabic, Persian, Urdu), would ever make claims that jihad is primarily nonviolent or has been superseded by the spiritual jihad. Such claims are made solely by Western scholars, primarily those who study Sufism and/or work in interfaith dialogue, and by Muslim apologists who are trying to present Islam in the most innocuous manner possible." Cook argued that "Presentations along these lines are ideological in tone and should be discounted for their bias and deliberate ignorance of the subject" and that "[i]t is no longer acceptable for Western scholars or Muslim apologists writing in non-Muslim languages to make flat, unsupported statements concerning the prevalence – either from a historical point of view or within contemporary Islam o f the spiritual jihad." Magdi Allam, an outspoken Egyptian-born Italian journalist, has described Islam as intrinsically violent and characterized by "hate and intolerance".

According to Fawzy Abdelmalek, "many Muslim scholars speak of Islam as a religion of peace and not of violence. They say that the non-Muslims misunderstand the Quran verses about Jihad and the conduct of war in Islam."

Dennis Prager, columnist and author, in responding to a movement that contends that Islam is "a religion of peace", wrote: "Now, Islam has never been a religion of peace. It began as a warlike religion and throughout its history, whenever possible, made war on non-Muslims – from the polytheists of North Africa to the Hindus of India, about 60 to 80 million of whom Muslims killed during their thousand-year rule there." John R. Neuman, a scholar on religion, describes Islam as "a perfect anti-religion" and "the antithesis of Buddhism".

Charles Mathewes characterizes the peace verses as saying that "if others want peace, you can accept them as peaceful even if they are not Muslim."  As an example, Mathewes cites the second sura, which commands believers not to transgress limits in warfare: "fight in God's cause against those who fight you, but do not transgress limits [in aggression]; God does not love transgressors" (2:190).

Lawrence Wright, author of a Pulitzer-prize-winning book, argued that role of Wahhabi literature in Saudi schools contributing suspicion and hate violence against non-Muslims as non-believers or infidels and anyone who "disagrees with Wahhabism is either an infidel or a deviant, who should repent or be killed." Andrew Bostom states that a number of jihads have targeted Christians, Hindus, and Jews.

Beheadings 

Beheading was a standard method of execution in pre-modern Islamic law. Though a formerly widespread execution method, its use had been abandoned in most countries by the end of the 20th century. Currently, it is used only in Saudi Arabia. It also remains a legal method of execution in Iran, Qatar and Yemen, where it is no longer in use.

Muhammad's beheading of 600-900 Jewish men and boys has also been criticised (Abu Dawud 4390, Quran 33:26, Q8:55–58, Sahih al-Bukhari 5:59:447, Sahih al-Bukhari 5:58:148, Ibn Kathir V.3. P.170, Ibn Ishaq p. 464).)

Homosexuality 

Critics such as lesbian activist Irshad Manji, former Muslims Ehsan Jami and the former Dutch politician Ayaan Hirsi Ali, have criticized Islam's attitudes towards homosexuals. Most international human rights organizations, such as Human Rights Watch and Amnesty International, condemn Islamic laws that make homosexual relations between consenting adults a crime. Since 1994 the United Nations Human Rights Committee has also ruled that such laws violated the right to privacy guaranteed in the Universal Declaration of Human Rights and the International Covenant on Civil and Political Rights.

In May 2008, the sexual rights lobby group Lambda Istanbul (based in Istanbul, Turkey) was banned by court order for violating a constitutional provision on the protection of the family and an article banning bodies with objectives that violate law and morality. This decision was then taken to the Court of Cassation and the ban lifted.

In 10 Muslim-majority countries homosexual acts may be punishable by death, though in some the punishment has never been carried out.

The ex-Muslim Ibn Warraq states that the Quran's condemnation of homosexuality has frequently been ignored in practice, and that Islamic countries were much more tolerant of homosexuality than Christian ones until fairly recently.

Short-term and limited marriages

Short-term marriage 

 ( literally pleasure marriage) is a fixed-term or short-term contractual marriage in Shia Islam. The duration of this type of marriage is fixed at its inception and is then automatically dissolved upon completion of its term. For this reason, nikah mut'ah has been widely criticised as the religious cover and legalization of prostitution. The Christian missionary Thomas Patrick Hughes criticized Mut'ah as allowing the continuation of "one of the abominable practices of ancient Arabia." Shi'a and Sunnis agree that Mut'ah was legal in early times, but Sunnis consider that it was abrogated. Ibn Kathir writes that "[t]here's no doubt that in the outset of Islam, Mut'ah was allowed under the Shari'ah". Currently, however, mut'ah is one of the distinctive features of Ja'fari jurisprudence. No other school of Islamic jurisprudence allows it. According to Imam Jafar as Sadiq, "One of the matters about which I shall never keep precautionary silence (taqiyya) is the matter of mu'tah." Allameh Tabatabaei defends the Shia view in Tafsir al-Mizan, arguing that there are mutawatir or nearly mutawatir traditions narrated from the Shia Imams that Mut'ah is permitted. For example, it has been narrated from Muhammad al-Baqir and Ja'far al-Sadiq that they said "regarding the [above] verse, and there is no blame on you about what you mutually agree after what is appointed." It means that he increases her dowry or she increases his (fixed) period.

Sunnis believe that Muhammad later abolished this type of marriage at several different large events, the most accepted being at Khaybar in 7 AH (629 CE) Bukhari 059.527 and at the Victory of Mecca in 8 AH (630 CE). Most Sunnis believe that Umar later was merely enforcing a prohibition that was established during Muhammad's time. Shia contest the criticism that nikah mut'ah is a cover for prostitution, and argue that the unique legal nature of temporary marriage distinguishes Mut'ah ideologically from prostitution.
Children born of temporary marriages are considered legitimate, and have equal status in law with their siblings born of permanent marriages, and do inherit from both parents. Women must observe a period of celibacy (idda) to allow for the identification of a child's legitimate father, and a woman can only be married to one person at a time, be it temporary or permanent. Some Shia scholars also view Mut'ah as a means of eradicating prostitution from society.

Contractually limited marriage

Nikah Misyar is a type of Nikah (marriage) in Sunni Islam only carried out through the normal contractual procedure, with the provision that the husband and wife give up several rights by their own free will, such as living together, equal division of nights between wives in cases of polygamy, the wife's rights to housing, and maintenance money ("nafaqa"), and the husband's right of homekeeping and access. Essentially the couple continue to live separately from each other, as before their contract, and see each other to fulfil their needs in a legally permissible (halal) manner when they please.
Misyar has been suggested by some western authors to be a comparable marriage with Nikah mut'ah and that they find it for the sole purpose of "sexual gratification in a licit manner" According to Florian Pohl, assistant professor of religion at Oxford College, Misyar marriage is a controversial issue in the Muslim world, as many see it as practice that encourages marriages for purely sexual purposes, or that it is used as a cover for a form of prostitutuion.

Professor Yusuf Al-Qaradawi observes that he does not promote this type of marriage, although he has to recognise that it is legal, since it fulfils all the requirements of the usual marriage contract. He states his preference that the clause of renunciation be not included within the marriage contract, but be the subject of a simple verbal agreement between the parties. Islamic scholars like Ibn Uthaimeen or Al-Albani claim, for their part, that misyar marriage may be legal, but not moral. They agree that the wife can at any time, reclaim the rights which she gave up at the time of contract. But, they are opposed to this type of marriage on the grounds that it contradicts the spirit of the Islamic law of marriage and that it has perverse effects on the woman, the family and the community in general.

For Al-Albani, misyar marriage may even be considered illicit, because it runs counter to the objectives and the spirit of marriage in Islam, as described in the Quran: "And among His signs is this, that He created for you mates from among yourselves, that ye may dwell in tranquility with them, and He has put love and mercy between your (hearts)…" Al-Albani also underlines the social problems which result from the "misyar" marriage, particularly in the event that children are born from this union. The children raised by their mother in a home from which the father is always absent, without reason, may suffer difficulties. The situation becomes even worse if the wife is abandoned or repudiated by her husband "misyar", with no means of subsistence, as usually happens.

Women in Islam

Domestic violence 

Many scholars claim Shari'a law encourages domestic violence against women, when a husband suspects nushuz (disobedience, disloyalty, rebellion, ill conduct) in his wife.

One of the verses of the Quran relating to permissibility of domestic violence is Surah 4:34. In deference to Surah 4:34, many nations with Shari'a law have refused to consider or prosecute cases of domestic abuse. Shari'a has been criticized for ignoring women's rights in domestic abuse cases. Musawah, CEDAW, KAFA and other organizations have proposed ways to modify Shari'a-inspired laws to improve women's rights in Islamic nations, including women's rights in domestic abuse cases.

On the other hand, scholars and commentators have stated that Muhammad directed men not to hit their wives' faces, he said in Farewell Sermon not to beat their wives in such a way as would leave marks on their body.

Personal status laws and child marriage 
Shari'a is the basis for personal status laws in most Islamic majority nations. These personal status laws determine rights of women in matters of marriage, divorce and child custody. A 2011 UNICEF report concludes that Shari'a law provisions are discriminatory against women from a human rights perspective. In legal proceedings under Shari'a law, a woman's testimony is worth half of a man's before a court.

Except for Iran, Lebanon and Bahrain, which allow child marriages, the civil code in Islamic majority countries do not allow child marriage of girls. However, with Shari'a personal status laws, Shari'a courts in all these nations have the power to override the civil code. The religious courts permit girls less than 18 years old to marry. As of 2011, child marriages are common in a few Middle Eastern countries, accounting for 1 in 6 of all marriages in Egypt and 1 in 3 marriages in Yemen. However, the average age at marriage in most Middle Eastern countries is steadily rising and is generally in the low to mid 20s for women. Rape is considered a crime in all countries, but laws in Bahrain, Iraq, Jordan, Libya, Morocco, Syria and Tunisia in some cases allow a rapist to escape punishment by marrying his victim, while in other cases the victim who complains is often prosecuted with the crime of Zina (adultery).

Women's right to property and consent 
Sharia grants women the right to inherit property from other family members, and these rights are written in detail. According to the Quran, 

The status of women in classical Islamic law compared favorably to their status under laws of other contemporaneous cultures such those of pre-modern Europe, both in terms of financial independence and access to divorce, but the situation is different if it is evaluated against modern conceptions. Furthermore, slave women were not granted the same legal rights. Sharia recognizes the basic inequality between master and women slave, between free women and slave women, between believers and non-believers, as well as their unequal rights. Sharia authorized the institution of slavery, using the words abd (slave) and the phrase ma malakat aymanukum ("that which your right hand owns") to refer to women slaves, seized as captives of war. Under classical Islamic law, Muslim men could have sexual relations with female captives and slaves without their consent.

Slave women under sharia did not have a right to own property, right to free movement or right to consent. Sharia, in Islam's history, provided religious foundation for enslaving non-Muslim women (and men), as well as encouraged slave's manumission. However, manumission required that the non-Muslim slave first convert to Islam. Non-Muslim slave women who bore children to their Muslim masters became legally free upon their master's death, and their children were presumed to be Muslims as their father, in Africa, and elsewhere.

Starting with the 20th century, Western legal systems evolved to expand women's rights, but women's rights under Islamic law have remained tied to Quran, hadiths and their faithful interpretation as sharia by Islamic jurists.

José Policarpo advice controversy 
On 14 January 2009, the Catholic Portuguese cardinal José Policarpo directed a warning to young women to "think twice" before marrying Muslim men: Christians should learn more about Islam and respect Muslims, but marrying a Muslim man is getting into a lot of trouble, that not even Allah knows where it would end, if the couple moved to an Islamic country. He also said that dialogue "with our Muslim brothers" is difficult, because it is possible to dialogue only with those who want to have dialogue. Human rights group Amnesty International criticized Policarpo for inciting "discrimination" and "intolerance", and a representative of the Muslim community in Portugal said they were hurt and surprised by his words, but remarked that his words could be interpreted as a call to respect differences and get to know the other religion. A spokesman for the Portuguese Episcopal Conference said the cardinal had offered "realistic advice" rather than "discrimination" or "contempt for another culture or religion".

Criticism of Muslim immigrants and immigration 

The extent of negative attitudes towards Muslims varies across different parts of Europe.

The immigration of Muslims to Europe has increased in recent decades. Friction has developed between their new neighbours. Conservative Muslim social attitudes on modern issues have caused controversy in Europe and elsewhere. Scholars argue about how much these attitudes are a result of Islamic beliefs. Some critics consider Islam to be incompatible with secular Western society, and that, unlike other religions, Islam positively commands its adherents to impose its religious law on all peoples, believers and unbelievers alike, whenever possible and by any means necessary. Their criticism has been partly influenced by a stance against multiculturalism advocated by recent philosophers, closely linked to the heritage of New Philosophers. Statements by proponents like Pascal Bruckner describe multiculturalism as an invention of an "enlightened" elite who deny the benefits of democratic rights to non-Westerners by chaining them to their roots. They believe this allows Islam free rein to propagate what they state are abuses, such as the mistreatment of women and homosexuals, and in some countries slavery. They also state that multiculturalism allows a degree of religious freedom that exceeds what is needed for personal religious freedom and is conducive to the creation of organizations aimed at undermining European secular or Christian values.

Emigrants from nearly every predominantly Muslim country have immigrated to Canada. According to a 2013 poll, 54% of Canadians had an unfavourable view of Islam, which was higher than for any other religion (Hinduism, Sikhism etc.).

In the United States, after the Boston Marathon bombing, the immigration processes in the country are assumed to be harder. Far-right commentator Bryan Fischer asked that no more visas be granted to Muslims, and no more mosques built; his opinion received support, most notably by the former presidential candidate Pat Buchanan.

Following the San Bernardino attack in 2015, Donald Trump, then a candidate for President, proposed "a total and complete shutdown of Muslims entering the United States, until we can figure out what the hell is going on". Throughout the campaign, Trump repeatedly described Islam and Muslim immigrants and refugees as a threat to the West, and condemned current President Barack Obama for not referring to Islamic State militants as "Islamic terrorists" or "radical Muslims", accusing Obama of cowardice in the face of radical Islam and claiming that Obama had "founded ISIS" through his foreign policy. Trump's rhetoric was condemned by his opponent, Hillary Clinton, as well as numerous Muslim advocacy groups and activists, and became a focal issue in the 2016 United States presidential election.

Comparison to communist and fascist ideologies 
 
In 2004, speaking to the Acton Institute on the problems of "secular democracy",  Cardinal George Pell drew a parallel between Islam and communism: "Islam may provide in the 21st century, the attraction that communism provided in the 20th, both for those that are alienated and embittered on the one hand and for those who seek order or justice on the other." Pell also agrees in another speech that its capacity for far-reaching renovation is severely limited. An Australian Islamist spokesman, Keysar Trad, responded to the criticism: "Communism is a godless system, a system that in fact persecutes faith". Geert Wilders, a Dutch member of parliament and leader of the Party for Freedom, has also compared Islam to fascism and communism.

Islamism

Writers such as Stephen Suleyman Schwartz and Christopher Hitchens, find some elements of Islamism fascistic. Malise Ruthven, a Scottish writer and historian who writes on religion and Islamic affairs, opposes redefining Islamism as "Islamofascism", but also finds the resemblances between the two ideologies "compelling".

French philosopher Alexandre del Valle compared Islamism with fascism and communism in his Red-green-brown alliance theory.

Responses to criticism 
John Esposito has written a number of introductory texts on Islam and the Islamic world. He has addressed issues including the rise of militant Islam, the veiling of women, and democracy. Esposito emphatically argues against what he calls the "pan-Islamic myth". He thinks that "too often coverage of Islam and the Muslim world assumes the existence of a monolithic Islam in which all Muslims are the same." To him, such a view is naive and unjustifiably obscures important divisions and differences in the Muslim world.

William Montgomery Watt in his book Muhammad: Prophet and Statesman addresses Muhammad's alleged moral failings. Watt argues on a basis of moral relativism that Muhammad should be judged by the standards of his own time and country rather than "by those of the most enlightened opinion in the West today."

Karen Armstrong, tracing what she believes to be the West's long history of hostility toward Islam, finds in Muhammad's teachings a theology of peace and tolerance. Armstrong holds that the "holy war" urged by the Quran alludes to each Muslim's duty to fight for a just, decent society.

Edward Said, in his essay Islam Through Western Eyes, writes that the general basis of Orientalist thought forms a study structure in which Islam is placed in an inferior position as an object of study. He argues the existence of a very considerable bias in Orientalist writings as a consequence of the scholars' cultural make-up. He states that Islam has been looked at with a particular hostility and fear due to many obvious religious, psychological and political reasons, all deriving from a sense "that so far as the West is concerned, Islam represents not only a formidable competitor but also a late-coming challenge to Christianity."

Cathy Young of Reason Magazine writes that "criticism of the religion is enmeshed with cultural and ethnic hostility" often painting the Muslim world as monolithic. While stating that the terms "Islamophobia" and "anti-Muslim bigotry" are often used in response to legitimate criticism of fundamentalist Islam and problems within Muslim culture, she argues that "the real thing does exist, and it frequently takes the cover of anti-jihadism."

In contrast to the widespread Western belief that women in Muslim societies are oppressed and denied opportunities to realize their full potential, most Muslims believe their faith to be liberating or fair to women, and some find it offensive that Westerners criticize it without fully understanding the historical and contemporary realities of Muslim women's lives. Conservative Muslims in particular (in common with some Christians and Jews) see women in the West as being economically exploited for their labor, sexually abused, and commodified through the media's fixation on the female body.

Bernard Lewis maintains that although slaves often suffered on the way before reaching their destination, they received good treatment and some degree of acceptance as members of their owners' households.

See also

References

Citations

Sources

Further reading

 
 
 
 
 Kepel, Gilles (2002). Jihad: The Trail of Political Islam. Belknap Press. .
 Kepel, Gilles (2004). The War for Muslim Minds. Harvard University Press. .
 Ibn Warraq (1995). Why I Am Not a Muslim. Prometheus Books. .
 Ibn Warraq (2003). Leaving Islam: Apostates Speak Out. Prometheus Books. .
 Cox, Caroline & Marks, John (2003). The 'West', Islam and Islamism: Is ideological Islam compatible with liberal democracy?. Civitas. .

External links
 

 
Islam
Islam-related controversies